Corey Hampson is a United States based author, curator and a director of Habatat.

Career
Corey Hampson graduated from the Hayworth’s School of Business at Western Michigan University. Over the course of his career, he acted as Director of Sales at Habatat Galleries for a period above 10 years. He is now the President and Owner of Habatat, based in Royal Oak, Michigan. Hampson has contributed multiple articles about studio glass.

As a curator, Hampson has worked on numerous Museum and Art Center exhibitions throughout the United States. He has been the host of the biggest and oldest annual studio glass exhibition in the world, now in its 47th year (2019). Titled the International Glass Invitational Award Exhibition, the annual event includes more than a hundred artists from around the world, twenty-five of whom are chosen in a juried exhibition to be featured in a group museum show at the Fort Wayne Museum of Art in Indiana.

A nationally-recognized scholar and expert on glass art, Hampson has built important collections for museums, organizations, and private collectors in the United States and abroad.

Hampson is the youngest member on the National Advisory Board of Directors for Art Alliance for Contemporary Glass (AACG). Additionally, he is the President of Michigan Glass Collecting Alliance (MGCA).

As an author, Hampson is credited with writing of the introduction of Glass Art: 112 Contemporary Artists.

Imagine Museum in Saint Petersburg, Florida:

Hampson curated the Imagine Museum collection, which includes more than 500 works in glass, at the behest of museum founder Trish Duggan. Hampson was tasked with creating a timeline, tracing the history of the American glass art movement, which began in the early 1960s, and to locate pieces that reflect the change and innovation in glass art over time. The collection is a comprehensive survey of the history of studio glass.

Hampson Gallery, Saint Petersburg, Florida:

A new glass gallery, owned and operated by Corey Hampson, is set to open in the former home of Urban Brews & BBQ, next door to the Imagine Museum, in late 2019.

Life's Work and Glass Family Tree:

The "Glass Family Tree" © was conceived of by Corey Hampson as a way to connect artists with their roots and act as a genealogy for the Studio Glass community. Among the institutions involved with the growth that help tell the story of glass in America are Penland, Pilchuck, Haystack, and UrbanGlass, among others.

In addition to glass art, Hampson has a passion for "street art," and building his own personal collection in the genre.

Publications
 Artdaily.org: "Habatat Galleries Announces the 47th International Glass Invitational Award Exhibition": May 4, 2019
 Glass Art: "112 Contemporary Artists".
 YourObserver.com: "Artists Travel From Italy to Open the 2017 Basch Glass Exhibition" https://www.yourobserver.com/photo/artists-travel-italy-open-2017-basch-glass-exhibition-mark-ormond-corey-hampson-carol-carmiener
 Catalyst Magazine: "Imagine Museum: A Cornerstone of Florida's 'Glass Coast': https://stpetecatalyst.com/imagine-museum-cornerstone-of-floridas-glass-coast/
 Tampa Bay Times: "Glass Art Shines at Saint Petersburg's New Imagine Museum": https://tampabay.com/things-to-do/visualarts/Glass-art-shines-at-St-Petersburg-s-new-Imagine-Museum_164752143
 The Oakland Press: "Dutch Artist Shares Works at Habatat International Exhibit": www.theoaklandpress.com
 Urban Glass: "Our Best SOFA Ever: A Conversation With Habatat Galleries' Corey Hampson": November 12, 2009

References

American art curators
American male writers